The  2020–21 Moroccan Women's Championship Division Two, is the first season of Moroccan tier 2 of women's football under its new professional format.

Group North

Teams 
Najah Azrou
Club Municipal Berkane
Club Oasis Errachidia
Jawhara Najm Larache
Nahdat M'diq
Amal Massira
Club Municipal Meknes
Union Midelt
Chabab Mohammedia
Zohour Mohammedia
Amal Ouazzane
Fath Rabat
FC Saïdia
Sadaqa Taourirt
Hilal Temara
Esperance Tighssaline

League table

Results

Group South

Teams 
Raja Ain Harouda
Association Al Fidaa
Sporting Casablanca
Rajaa Dakhla
Association Fqih Bensaleh
Academie Phoenix Marrakesh
Kawkab Marrakesh
Association Nojoum Almostoqbal
Union Rahma
Zohour Safi
Forum Settat
Nassr Sidi Moumen
Najah Souss
Atlas Taliouine
Association Tamasna
Nahdat Tan-Tan

League table

Results

See also
2020–21 Moroccan Women's Championship Division One
2019-20 Moroccan Women's Throne Cup
2020–21 Botola

References

Women's football in Morocco